Brother Jack Meets the Boss is an album by the organist Jack McDuff and the saxophonist Gene Ammons recorded in 1962 and released on the Prestige label.

Recording and music
The album was recorded at the Van Gelder Studio, Englewood Cliffs, New Jersey, on January 23, 1962. Although billed as a meeting of organist Jack McDuff and tenor saxophonist Gene Ammons, a second tenorist, Harold Vick, played on all of the tracks, as did guitarist Eddie Diehl and drummer Joe Dukes.

Three of the six tracks were written by McDuff; the first, "Watch Out", is an uptempo blues.

Reception

The Allmusic review by Scott Yanow stated "this is a very successful soul-jazz/hard bop outing... Ammons, whose every note was always full of passion, fits in perfectly with McDuff's group". Marc Myers described the recording as "a superb bluesy album".

Track listing 
All compositions by Jack McDuff except where noted.
 "Watch Out" – 5:08  
 "Strollin'" (Horace Silver) – 6:14  
 "Mellow Gravy" – 5:00  
 "Christopher Columbus" (Chu Berry, Andy Razaf) – 6:22  
 "Buzzin' Round" (Michael Edwards, Jack McDuff) – 6:12  
 "Mr. Clean" (Eddie "Cleanhead" Vinson) – 7:57

Personnel 
Gene Ammons – tenor saxophone
Jack McDuff – organ
Harold Vick – tenor saxophone
Eddie Diehl – guitar
Joe Dukes – drums

References 

 

1962 albums
Prestige Records albums
Gene Ammons albums
Jack McDuff albums
Albums recorded at Van Gelder Studio
Albums produced by Esmond Edwards
Collaborative albums